Nwokolo is a surname. Notable people with the surname include:

Charles Nwokolo (born 1960), Nigerian boxer
Chukwuedu Nwokolo (1921-2014), Nigerian medical doctor 
Chuma Nwokolo (born 1963), Nigerian born lawyer, writer, and publisher
Greg Nwokolo (born 1986), Nigerian-born Indonesian footballer
Nwabueze Nwokolo (born 1954), Nigerian born United Kingdom lawyer